Mesoereis bifasciata is a species of beetle in the family Cerambycidae, and the type species of its genus. It was described by Maurice Pic in 1925, originally under the genus Ereis. It is known from Vietnam, China and Taiwan.

References

Mesosini
Beetles described in 1925